Daniel Maynard may refer to:

 Daniel Díaz Maynard (c. 1934–2007), Uruguayan lawyer and politician
 Daniel Maynard Burgess (1828–1911), American surgeon and explorer